Grandes Canciones is a term in Spanish for a Greatest hits album. It may make reference to: 
 Grandes Canciones (Noel Schajris album)
 Grandes Canciones (Rata Blanca album)

See also
 Greatest Hits (disambiguation)